Ayer's Cliff (2021 population 1,180) is a village municipality in the Memphrémagog Regional County Municipality in the Estrie region of Quebec.  It is located just north of the Canada–United States border, on Lake Massawippi, near the mouth of the Tomifobia River.

History
In the early 1910s and 1920s a number of wealthy Americans built summer estates in Ayer's Cliff. These included the railroad mogul Charles Keller Beekman, Chicago attorney David Leavitt Hough, Charles W. Parker, and George Fuller Parker, a close friend of President Grover Cleveland.

Ayer's Cliff still maintains a large anglophone population, with roots going back to the late 18th century. Today, Ayer's Cliff and the surrounding region are home to a combination of seasonal and year-round residents. The village is the site of Ripplecove Inn, a world-renowned luxury resort featured on CTV Travel's Most Romantic Hideaways.

The annual Ayer's Cliff Fair has been a popular gathering place for Eastern Townshippers since 1845. It is a multi-day event that includes animal shows, rides, attractions and entertainment for all.

Demographics 

Notable people 
During the 1930s, multi-millionaire sportsman Foxhall P. Keene maintained a seasonal residence in Ayer's Cliff where he died in 1941.
American novelist and essayist Upton Sinclair also spent time in Ayer's Cliff in the 1930s.

See also 
 List of village municipalities in Quebec
 Tomifobia River
 Wulftec International
 Ayer's Cliff Fair

References

Incorporated places in Estrie
Villages in Quebec